Educational Records Bureau (ERB) is an educational services Non-profit Organization  that offers assessments for both admission and achievement for independent and selective public schools for Pre K-grade 12.

ERB was founded in 1927, and is headquartered in New York City with over 2000 independent school and public school members globally.

Leadership

The organization is governed by a dedicated board of trustees.

Testing/assessment programs

ERB was mentioned in a New York Times article in 2011 after about 7000 (or 17%) of tested students had incorrect scores due to an error in use of a scoring key. Commenting on the effect in the New York Times, David F. Clune, president of ERB, stated, “It is a lesson we all learn at some point — that life isn’t fair.”  Errors in scoring had affected a smaller number of students at other testing organizations, most notably with an error in the scoring of 4000 students in the October 2005 administration of the SAT.

References

External links 
 Main page
 Learning assessments types

Organizations established in 1927
Organizations based in New York City